The semisoft sign (Ҍ ҍ; italics: Ҍ ҍ) is a letter of the Cyrillic script.

The semisoft sign is used in the alphabet of the Kildin Sami language, where it indicates palatalization (sometimes also called "half-palatalization") of the preceding stop, .

It has a similar shape to the yat (ѣ) but the horizontal stroke across the upright is shorter.

Computing codes

See also 

 Ѣ ѣ : Cyrillic letter Yat
 Cyrillic characters in Unicode

References 

Writing